The 1979 All-Ireland Senior Camogie Championship was the high point of the 1979 season. The championship was won by Antrim who defeated Tipperary by a three-point margin in the final. The match drew an attendance of 2,900.

Semi-finals
Kilkenny disposed of reigning champions Cork at Douglas by 4-5 to 0-10 on June 17 in the first round of the most open championship draw since the open draw was introduced six years earlier. Cork pleaded with some justification that midfielder Clare Cronin was nursing a leg injury, Marie Costine was ill and Pat Moloney had unexpectedly announced her retirement from the game. Antrim then surprised championship favourites Kilkenny by 5–5 to 4–3 at Randalstown on July 29 with two goals each from Kathleen McCaughey and Philomena Gillespie while Angela Downey scored three breakaway goals for Kilkenny.

Antrim went on to defeat Wexford, in the All Ireland semi-final at the same venue. A Margaret Griffin goal in the first half gave Tipperary victory over Limerick who were contesting their first ever senior semi-final.

Final
Irish Press journalist Maol Muire Tynan, who played for Tipperary against Antrim in the 1979 All-Ireland final, wrote about her experience in the following day's newspaper. Her piece reflects the frustrations of a defeated player, as well as those of an inter-county camogie player in the face of the general apathy shown towards women’s sport:
Even when the lead slipped away from us, we fought back, desperate to inscribed our name on an All-Ireland trophy. But Fate, or, should I say, Antrim’s sheer talent and abundant stamina, interfered with our plans. Yesterday’s weather in Croke Park provided the perfect setting to an exciting duel. It was regrettable that those natural elements were not complemented by properly defined sidelines or freshly painted goal posts. Yet this game was a cracking performance of speed and skill. The few thousand supporters, all confined to the Hogan Stand, showed their appreciation as enthusiastically as the 53,535 who thronged it the previous week. The first 25 minutes were magical for Tipperary and by half time it seemed that the O'Duffy was southward bound. But our confidence was unjustified, the scoreboard did not reflect the run of play. While our forwards were running through a crumbling Antrim defence, their efforts rarely came to fruitful conclusion. This was due to the incredible anticipation of Antrim goalkeeper Carol Blaney who celebrated her 21st birthday in style. Antrim have successfully overcome the restrictions and difficulties the game has faced during the past decade. For the superb Antrim side, it is the resurrection of camogie in Northern ranks, while we in the Premier County, with our long, impressive tradition of hurling, must painfully carry out the post mortem on our sister game.

Final stages

MATCH RULES
50 minutes
Replay if scores level
Maximum of 3 substitutions

See also
 All-Ireland Senior Hurling Championship
 Wikipedia List of Camogie players
 National Camogie League
 Camogie All Stars Awards
 Ashbourne Cup

References

External links
 Camogie Association
 All-Ireland Senior Camogie Championship: Roll of Honour
 Historical reports of All Ireland finals
 Camogie on facebook
 Camogie on GAA Oral History Project

All-Ireland Senior Camogie Championship
1979
Cam
All-Ireland Senior Camogie Championship
All-Ireland Senior Camogie Championship
All-Ireland Senior Camogie Championship
All-Ireland Senior Camogie Championship